The Journal of Phonetics is a peer-reviewed academic journal that covers topics in phonetics and phonology. It was established in 1973 and appears six times a year. It is published by Elsevier and the current editor-in-chief is Taehong Cho (Hanyang University).

According to the Journal Citation Reports, the journal has a 2020 impact factor of 2.67, ranked among top 10% in the field of linguistics.  The journal also has a 2018 CiteScore of 2.35 (based on the citations recorded in the Scopus ), ranked among top 5% in the field of Language and Linguistics.

Aims and scope 
The Journal of Phonetics publishes papers of an experimental or theoretical nature that deal with phonetic aspects of language and linguistic communication processes. Papers dealing with technological and/or pathological topics, or papers of an interdisciplinary nature are also suitable, provided that linguistic-phonetic principles underlie the work reported. 

Regular articles, review articles, and letters to the editor are published. Themed issues are also published, devoted entirely to a specific subject of interest within the field of phonetics.

Editors-in-Chief 
 1973-1985 M. A. A. Tatham (University of Essex, UK)
 1985-1989 M. P. R. van den Broecke (University of Utrecht, the Netherlands)
 1989-1995 Mary Beckman (Ohio State University, USA)
 1995-1997 Patrice Speeter Beddor (University of Michigan, USA)
 1998-1999 Terrance M. Nearey and Bruce L. Derwing (University of Alberta, Canada) 
 1999-2007 Gerry Docherty (University of Newcastle-upon-Tyne, UK)
 2008-2011 Stefan A. Frisch (University of South Florida, USA)
 2011-2016 Kenneth de Jong (Indiana University, USA)
 2016-     Taehong Cho (Hanyang University, Seoul, Korea)

Abstracting and indexing 
The journal is abstracted and indexed in:

References

External links 
 

Phonetics journals
Phonology journals
Publications established in 1973
English-language journals
Quarterly journals
Elsevier academic journals